David Sheldon Moore is an American statistician, who is known for his leadership of statistics education for many decades.

Biography
David S. Moore received his A.B. from Princeton University and the Ph.D. from Cornell University in mathematics.

In statistics education, David S. Moore is the author of a series of influential textbooks in statistical science, which use only high school algebra: Introduction to the Practice of Statistics (with  George McCabe), of An Introduction to the Basic Practice of Statistics, and of Statistics: Concepts and Controversies.

In statistical science, David S. Moore has done research in the asymptotic theory of robust and nonparametric statistics.

Professor Moore was the 1998 President of the American Statistical Association.

David S. Moore is a retired (in 2004) Shanti S. Gupta Distinguished Professor of Statistics, Emeritus at Purdue University.

Professor Moore has served as the second president of the International Association for Statistical Education. He was the content developer for the Annenberg/Corporation for Public Broadcasting college-level telecourse Against All Odds: Inside Statistics.

Publications
 Introduction to the Practice of Statistics with George McCabe. 
 The Basic Practice of Statistics. 
 Statistics: Concepts and Controversies.

References

Fellows of the American Statistical Association
Purdue University faculty
Statistics educators

American statisticians
Cornell University alumni
Living people
Year of birth missing (living people)